"Hate You" is a song recorded by South Korean girl group Ladies' Code. It was released as a digital single on August 6, 2013 by Polaris Entertainment and served as a pre-release track for their second mini-album Code#02 Pretty Pretty.

Track listing

Charts

Sales

Release history

References

External links
  (channel: LadiesCode)
  (channel: CJENMMUSIC)

2013 singles
2013 songs
Korean-language songs
Ladies' Code songs